Per "Pelle" Fosshaug (born 24 February 1965) is a Swedish bandy manager and former bandy player. Fosshaug played in midfield for many clubs in Sweden, as well as for the Sweden national bandy team, for which he made a record 129 appearances between 1994 and 2005.

Fosshaug has made 129 appearances for Sweden.

Career
His career began in the 1982–83 season where he played for second division side Borlänge-Stora Tuna BK. In 1986, he moved to Allsvenskan side Falu BS, where he spent two seasons, followed by another two at IFK Vänersborg. In 1992, he made the move to Västerås SK Bandy, the club which he became most commonly associated with. During his time with Västerås SK, Fosshaug made the majority of his national team appearances. In 2004, he joined Sandvikens AIK. He was perhaps a surprise inclusion in the Swedish national bandy team for that season's Bandy World Championship, but made 7 appearances in the tournament, scoring 2 goals. After just one year at Sandvikens AIK, Fosshaug stepped down a division to join Tillberga IK, helping the team win promotion to the Allsvenskan, which at the time was the top-tier in Swedish bandy.

After his active playing career, Fosshaug has been a coach for Borlänge-Stora Tuna BK and for the Somalia national bandy team.

Honours

Country 
 Sweden
 Bandy World Championship: 1993, 1995, 1997, 2003, 2005

References

1965 births
Living people
Swedish bandy players
Swedish bandy managers
Borlänge-Stora Tuna BK players
Falu BS players
IFK Vänersborg players
Västerås SK Bandy players
Sandvikens AIK players
Tillberga IK Bandy players
Sweden international bandy players
Bandy World Championship-winning players